Gordon Reginald Goodwin (17 December 1895 – February 1984) was a British athlete who competed mainly in the 10 kilometre walk. He competed for Great Britain in the 1924 Summer Olympics held in Paris, France, in the 10 kilometre walk where he won the silver medal. He was born in Lambeth in London and died in Leigh, Greater Manchester.

References

External links

1895 births
1984 deaths
British male racewalkers
English male racewalkers
People from Lambeth
Athletes from London
Athletes (track and field) at the 1924 Summer Olympics
Olympic athletes of Great Britain
Olympic silver medallists for Great Britain
Medalists at the 1924 Summer Olympics
Olympic silver medalists in athletics (track and field)